Soo-jung, also spelled Soo-jeong, or Su-jeong, Su-jung, Su-jong, is a Korean feminine given name. The meaning differs based on the hanja used to write each syllable of the name. There are 90 hanja with the reading "soo" and 84 hanja with the reading "jung" on the South Korean government's official list of hanja which may be used in given names. It also means "crystal" in Korean which uses the hanja "水晶".

People with this name include:

Sportspeople
Park Soo-jeong (born 1972), South Korean female volleyball player
Lim Su-jeong (kickboxer) (born 1985), South Korean female kickboxer
Lim Su-jeong (taekwondo) (born 1986), South Korean female taekwondo practitioner
Hong Su-jong (born 1986 or 1989), North Korean female artistic gymnast
Jang Su-jeong (born 1995), South Korean female tennis player
Kim Su-jong (born 2000), North Korean female artistic gymnast

Entertainers
Hwang Soo-jung (born 1972), South Korean actress
Im Soo-jung (born 1979), South Korean actress
Lee Soo-jung (born 1993), Korean-American singer-songwriter
Krystal Jung (Korean name Jung Soo-jung, born 1994), South Korean female singer, member of girl group f(x)
Ryu Su-jeong (born 1997), South Korean female singer, member of girl group Lovelyz
Kim Su-jung (born 2004), South Korean actress

Other
Andrew Yeom Soo-jung (born 1943), Roman Catholic Archbishop of Seoul
Kim Soo-jung (born 1950), South Korean male cartoonist
Soo Jung Ann (born 1989), South Korean female pianist
Christel Lee (Korean name Lee Soo-jung, born 1990), American-Canadian female violinist of Korean descent

See also
List of Korean given names

References

Korean feminine given names